Series 20 of British television drama The Bill was broadcast from 7 January until 30 December 2004, and continued to use the serialized format introduced by Paul Marquess during Series 18. The series consisted of 94 regular episodes, and two episodes from a new documentary spin-off; The Bill: Uncovered. The first part, Des & Reg, came when ex-PC Des Taviner returned after faking his death in an explosion in the previous series, with his capture for the fatal station fire in 2002 and eventual death in custody bringing an end to the plot that ran for nearly two years. The second, "Kerry's Story", came after the death of PC Kerry Young at the hands of PC Gabriel Kent. Kent took centre stage in series 20 as he established himself as a fully-fledged villain; he first colluded with a gang of thugs to beat up criminals who evaded justice, before later colluding with a sniper to kill those who escaped justice. His murder of Young saw him frame the sniper by using his gun and method, having raped and bullied Young for refusing to embark on a relationship with him. Kent capped a year where his villainy dominated events by committing a second murder, throwing the sniper he colluded with off a fifth-storey balcony to his death to stop him being arrested.

In addition to the station fire plot, Series 20 saw the conclusion of another long term storyline when Cathy Bradford's crimes surrounding her obsession with colleague Brandon Kane culminated in a showdown in the station basement. Renowned actress Lynda Bellingham joined the show as a series regular, portraying villainess Irene Radford, the matriarch of a crime family whose husband murdered DC Rob Thatcher's father in the 1980s, with Thatcher spending a majority of the plot trying to arrest members of the Radford family, later going on the run as part of his exit storyline. DS Samantha Nixon also took centre stage in a storyline that saw her daughter Abigail abducted by Samantha's ex-boyfriend Hugh Wallis, introduced as part of a long-running storyline targeting a serial rapist, a plot which would continue into series 21.

As a celebration of the show's 21st anniversary, a special weekend of programmes were broadcast on UKTV Gold; The Bill @ 21 Weekend. UKTV Gold showed several classic episodes over the course of two days, with special scenes in between that gave the impression that several characters were reminiscing over the last 21 years at Sun Hill. Sergeant June Ackland, trainee DC Gary Best and PCs Tony Stamp & Reg Hollis were joined by former series regular George Garfield. As part of the anniversary celebrations, ITV broadcast two special episodes; Sergeant June Ackland and DC Jim Carver, who were the protagonists of the pilot Woodentop, married after being close friends for the entirety of their time at Sun Hill together. A second episode saw DCI Jack Meadows take a week's holiday to attend former DS Ted Roach's funeral - but, after suspecting Roach may have been murdered, he teams up with former Sergeants Alec Peters (Larry Dann) and Bob Cryer (Eric Richard) to find out the truth. 

As had become a regular occurrence under producer Paul Marquess, the cast frequently changed throughout the course of the series, with several characters arriving or exiting, although the series also aired a six-episode return for infamous ex-DS Don Beech. A majority of the characters that left were introduced by Marquess, however established regulars Debbie McAllister, Nick Klein and Polly Page left after four, five and 12 years respectively. While actress Lisa Geoghan chose to leave due to family commitments, she was the fifth actor with over ten years experience on the show to have left since Marquess took over; however her character Polly Page was one of two not to be killed off as part of their exit storyline.

On 16 October 2013, the complete series was released on DVD in Australia as a Region 0, playable anywhere in the world. The DVD synopsis removes all titles, and tallies the episodes by number.

Cast changes

Arrivals
 PC Andrea Dunbar (Office Politics-)
 PC Lance Powell (Rookies and Professionals-)
 SCP Jonathan Fox (Rookies and Professionals-)
 Laura Bryant (Rogue Tourist-)
 PC Steve Hunter (The Start of a Problem-)
 DC Suzie Sim (The Pocket Cop-)
 PC Roger Valentine (Old Timer-)
 PC Amber Johannsen (Beginner's Luck-)
 PC Leela Kapoor (The Perfect Alibi-)

Departures
 DC Brandon Kane - Resigns after Cathy Bradford is brought to justice
 PC Cathy Bradford - Sent to the state hospital of the criminally insane
 DC Eva Sharpe - Accepts a transfer to MIT after being bullied by DI Neil Manson
 PC Des Taviner - Murdered by a crazed prisoner he was sharing a cell with
 PC Nick Klein - Entered into witness protection to escape from Dennis Weaver
 CADO Polly Page - Resigns after being warned not to pursue private investigations
 Laura Bryant - Temporary departure after ending allegiance with PC Gabriel Kent to run criminals off her local estate
 PC Cameron Tait - Returns to Australia after breakup with Kerry Young
 SCP Jonathan Fox - Temporary departure after realising Gina Gold didn't want to commit to their long-term relationship
 PC Kerry Young - Shot dead by PC Gabriel Kent, posing as the 'Sun Hill Sniper'
 DS Debbie McAllister - Resigns to spend time with her son
 DC Rob Thatcher - Shot dead by S019 after shooting Irene Radford

Episodes

2004 British television seasons
The Bill series